The 1925 Miami Redskins football team was an American football team that represented Miami University in the Ohio Athletic Conference (OAC) during the 1925 college football season. In its second season under head coach Chester Pittser, Miami compiled a 5–3 record (3–2 against OAC opponents), shut out four of eight opponents, and outscored all opponents by a total of 120 to 55. Tom Sharkey was the team captain.

Schedule

References

Miami
Miami RedHawks football seasons
Miami Redskins football